The Canon Court de 105 M(montagne) modèle 1919 Schneider (105 mm mle.19) was a French mountain gun produced by Schneider and intended to be used in conjunction with the 75 mm mle.19 that was used by a number of countries during World War II.

Design

The modèle 1919 was built from steel and had two spoked wheels, interrupted screw breech, hydro-pneumatic recoil system, box trail carriage and a rounded gun shield to protect the crew. For transport, this gun could be broken down into 8 sections, the barrel could be dismantled into 2 sections. A latter variant called the Canon Court de 105 M(montagne) modèle 1928 Schneider was produced in 1928. The modèle 1928 can be identified by its squared off gun shield and may have had a sprung axle and pneumatic tires for motor traction.

Users

 
 
  - Captured French guns were given the designations 10.5 cm le.GebH 322(f) for modèle 1919 guns and 10.5 cm le.GebH 323(f) for modèle 1928 guns in German service.
 
 
  - Japan produced a copy of captured Chinese modèle 1928 guns designated the Type 99 10 cm Mountain Gun.  Performance and dimensions of the Japanese gun were very similar.
  - Licensed production began in 1924 at Trubia and was designated Obús Schneider 105/11 Modelo 1919.
  - Captured Yugoslav guns were given the designation 10.5 cm le.GebH 329(j) in German service.

Gallery

References

Schneider Electric
Artillery of France
World War II weapons of France
105 mm artillery
World War II mountain artillery
World War II artillery of Greece